The 2022 Première ligue de soccer du Québec féminine season will be the fifth season of play for the Première ligue de soccer du Québec, a Division 3 women's soccer league in the Canadian soccer pyramid and the highest level of soccer based in the Canadian province of Québec.

A.S. Blainville won their third consecutive league title, as well as their second consecutive Coupe PLSQ. AS Blainville and AS Laval qualified for the League1 Canada Interprovincial Championship with Blainville winning the title and Laval finishing as runner-ups.

Changes from 2021
The 2022 season will have its greatest number of participating teams with 12 teams. AS Chaudière-Ouest and the Québec girls EXCEL program join as expansion franchises. CS Monteuil became AS Laval following a merger with another non-PLSQ club.

Each team will play each other once, with the top four clubs qualifying for the Coupe PLSQ. After the season, there will be a Final Four tournament, hosted in Laval, featuring two PLSQ teams and the champions of League1 Ontario and League1 British Columbia to decide the champion of League1 Canada.

Teams
Twelve teams will participate in the 2022 season.

Standings

Top scorers

Awards

Coupe PLSQ 

Semi-finals

Final

References

2022 in Canadian soccer
2022
Quebec W